South Carolina held its elections October 10–11, 1814.

See also 
 United States House of Representatives elections, 1814 and 1815
 List of United States representatives from South Carolina

Notes 

1814
South Carolina
United States House of Representatives